Lost Signs (French: Mystère) is a French television miniseries. The plot revolves around alien abductions. In France, the miniseries was first launched on 20 June 2007. The miniseries stars Toinette Laquière, who previously acted in another miniseries which was also written by Malina Detcheva and Franck Ollivier called Zodiac Murders 2.

Cast

 Toinette Laquière : Laure de Lestrade
 Louna Baudry : Young Laure
 Arnaud Binard : Xavier Mayer
 Yann Sundberg : François de Lestrade
 Babsie Steger : Erika de Lestrade
 Marisa Berenson : Irène de Lestrade
 François Vincentelli : Lorenzo Dallaglio
 Antoine de Prekel : Lucas de Lestrade
 Xavier Lafitte : Christopher Leroux
 Lio : Michèle Costa
 Farida Rahouadj : Lise Alban
 Cécile Pallas : Jeanne Laborde
 Samantha Marciszewer : Julie
 Zoé Duthion : Manon Dallaglio
 Ronald Guttman : Professeur Roger / Gaston Denis
 Fanny Cottençon : Anne de Lestrade
 Jean-Philippe Écoffey : Paul Costa
 Samuel Jouy : Thierry Courcelles
 Bernard Blancan : Simon Castaneda
 Adama Niane : Paolo Bruni
 Karen Alyx : Nurse Sandrine
 Patrick Bauchau : Général de Lestrade
 Max Boublil : Tom

See also
 List of French television series

References

External links

2000s French television series
2007 French television series debuts
2007 French television series endings
2000s French television miniseries
Mystery television series
French science fiction television series
Alien abduction in television